United Nations Security Council resolution 582, adopted unanimously on 24 February 1986, after noting that the council had been seized for six years and the continued conflict between Iran and Iraq, the council deplored the initial acts that started the Iran–Iraq War and continuation of the conflict.

The Council then condemned the escalation of the conflict, including territorial incursions, the bombing of civilian areas, attacks on neutral shipping, violation of international law and use of chemical weapons by Iraq, contrary to the Geneva Protocol of 1925.

The resolution called upon Iran and Iraq to cease hositilies and observe a ceasefire, with a complete withdrawal of military forces to their internationally recognised borders, as well as an exchange of prisoners of war facilitated by the International Committee of the Red Cross. It also urged both parties to submit all aspects of the conflict immediately to mediation and requested the Secretary-General Javier Pérez de Cuéllar to continue his efforts in the mediation process.

Compliance with Resolution 582 was voluntary, and both parties refused to implement it.

See also
 Iran–Iraq relations
 Iran–Iraq War
 List of United Nations Security Council Resolutions 501 to 600 (1982–1987)
 Resolutions 479, 514, 522, 540, 552, 588, 598, 612, 616, 619 and 620

References

External links
 
Text of the Resolution at United Nations Digital Library

 0582
 0582
Iran–Iraq relations
1986 in Iran
1986 in Iraq
February 1986 events